Ratsliveonnoevilstar is an EP by American musician Annie Clark, released on February 2, 2003. The title is a palindrome coined by the poet Anne Sexton.

This EP was recorded while Clark was a student at Berklee College of Music. Other Berklee students back her on the release, including jazz bassist Mark Kelley and drummer Walker Adams.

Track listing

Personnel
 Annie Clark - vocals, guitar, co-producer
 Mark Kelley - bass
 Walker Adams - drums
 David W. Prout - co-producer
 Matt Ellis - mixer

References 

2003 debut EPs
St. Vincent (musician) albums
Self-released EPs